In the 2010–11 season, Barnsley competed in the Championship. Barnsley finished in 17th-place on 56 points. Barnsley also competed in the FA Cup and League Cup, in which they were eliminated in the third and first rounds respectively. The season covers the period from 1 July 2010 to 30 June 2011.

Championship

Standings

Squad details

(C)

[Academy Graduate]

[Academy Graduate]

 [Academy Graduate]

Pre-season
Jon Macken, Daniel Bogdanovic, Darren Moore, Anderson de Silva, Simon Heslop, Rob Kozluk and Michael Coulson were all released from Oakwell with Heslop signing for Oxford United Bogdanovic and Kozluk joining Sheffield United, Moore joining Burton Albion and Coulson joining Grimsby Town.

The Reds began their summer recruiting by bringing in Motherwell winger Jim O'Brien on a free transfer. Jason Shackell was then signed from Wolves for an undisclosed fee. Serbian midfielder Goran Lovre joined from FC Groningen. Striker Liam Dickinson then followed from Brighton for an undisclosed fee. Derby full-back Jay McEveley was next in at Oakwell on a free transfer. Next was Stoke City's Uruguayan international Diego Arismendi on a season-long loan. Contract rebel Hugo Colace then rejoined the Reds after leaving the club at the end of his previous deal.

Squad statistics
Last Updated 12 April 2011

|}

Goalscorers

Transfers

In

Out
Indicates player joined club after being released.

Loans In

Loans Out

Disciplinary record

Yellow cards

Red cards

Fixtures and results

Friendlies

Star denotes a Barnsley XI friendly.

Championship

FA Cup

League Cup

Penalties awarded

References

Barnsley
Barnsley F.C. seasons

zh:班士利2009年至2010年球季